Charlotte Elizabeth Webb, MBE ( Vine-Stevens; born 13 May 1923) worked as a code breaker at Bletchley Park during World War II at the age of 18. Starting in 1941 she joined the British Auxiliary Territorial Service. She said, of joining the top-secret mission at Bletchley, "I wanted to do something more for the war effort than bake sausage rolls."

Webb grew up with a German au pair before becoming an exchange student in Germany. Upon arrival at Bletchley she was tasked with cataloging encrypted German radio messages intercepted by the British, contributing to the breaking of the German cipher Enigma. During her time at Bletchley she also worked on intercepted Japanese messages. After the war ended in Europe, Webb traveled to Washington D.C. to assist the Americans with the war in the Pacific.

As of February 2021, Webb lived in Worcestershire, England.

Webb was awarded an MBE in 2015. In 2021, Webb's work at Bletchley Park was recognized by the government of France with the award of the Légion d’Honneur.

See also
 Women in Bletchley Park

References

External links 
 The Last Voices of World War II: Betty Webb, British Intelligence
 Walk Among Heroes Podcast: Episode 12 - Betty Webb (Code-Breaker at Bletchley Park)

1923 births
Living people
Place of birth missing (living people)
Bletchley Park people
Bletchley Park women